Carter is a census-designated place (CDP) in Chouteau County, Montana, United States. The population was 58 at the 2010 census.

Carter's name was changed from Sidney in 1905 to honor Thomas H. Carter, the state's first congressional representative.

Geography
Carter is located in western Chouteau County at  (47.781252, -110.955800). It is along U.S. Route 87, which leads northeast  to Fort Benton, the county seat, and southwest  to Great Falls.

Climate
According to the Köppen Climate Classification system, Carter has a semi-arid climate, abbreviated "BSk" on climate maps.

Demographics

As of the census of 2000, there were 62 people, 31 households, and 19 families residing in the CDP. The population density was 21.3 people per square mile (8.2/km2). There were 34 housing units at an average density of 11.7 per square mile (4.5/km2). The racial makeup of the CDP was 100.00% White.

There were 31 households, out of which 12.9% had children under the age of 18 living with them, 58.1% were married couples living together, 3.2% had a female householder with no husband present, and 38.7% were non-families. 32.3% of all households were made up of individuals, and 12.9% had someone living alone who was 65 years of age or older. The average household size was 2.00 and the average family size was 2.42.

In the CDP, the population was spread out, with 12.9% under the age of 18, 4.8% from 18 to 24, 27.4% from 25 to 44, 30.6% from 45 to 64, and 24.2% who were 65 years of age or older. The median age was 47 years. For every 100 females, there were 100.0 males. For every 100 females age 18 and over, there were 116.0 males.

The median income for a household in the CDP was $24,583, and the median income for a family was $33,125. Males had a median income of $16,250 versus $23,125 for females. The per capita income for the CDP was $19,397. There were 9.5% of families and 13.4% of the population living below the poverty line, including 33.3% of under eighteens and 12.0% of those over 64.

Hall of Fame
The Carter, Montana Hall of Fame honors celebrities who have visited the city. As of 2010, there were seven inductees, including Keanu Reeves, Arsenio Hall, Charlie Sheen, Eddie Vedder, Steve Smith and Harry Truman. Professional wrestler CM Punk was inducted into the Hall of Fame on May 15, 2010.

References

Census-designated places in Chouteau County, Montana
Census-designated places in Montana